Asim or ASIM may refer to:
                        
Andromeda Spaceways Inflight Magazine, a fantasy and science fiction magazine 
Aseem, a male given name of Indian origin, often spelled Asim
Asem, a male given name of Arabic origin, sometimes spelled Asim
Asynchronous induction motor, a type of electric AC motorcycle 
Atmosphere-Space Interactions Monitor, a project led by the European Space Agency

See also

 
 Azim (disambiguation)
 Asem (disambiguation)